Azospirillum lipoferum is a species of microaerophilic, gram-negative, rod-shaped, nitrogen-fixing bacteria. They are currently most notable for the ability to enhance the success of certain agricultural plant products such as maize, rice, and wheat.

References

Rhodospirillales